Prototype This! is an American television with the stated goal to "look into the viability of gadgets and technology seen in science-fiction movies". The series premiered on October 15, 2008, on The Discovery Channel. It was filmed on Treasure Island in Building 180 and occasionally at Standard Metal Products in San Francisco.

The show follows a team of inventors:
 Doc North – Material Science, University of California, Santa Barbara
 Joe Grand – Bachelor of Science in Electrical Engineering, Boston University
 Terry Sandin – Special Effects Designer, Hollywood
 Dr. Andrew 'Zoz' Brooks – 3 degrees from the University of Adelaide, namely, Bachelor of Science (Organic Chemistry & Computer Science), First Class Honours in Computer Science and a Graduate Diploma in Education plus a Masters from the Australian National University's robotics laboratory and a PhD from the Massachusetts Institute of Technology (MIT).

Production
Although this show shares producers (Beyond Productions) and location (San Francisco Bay Area, California) with the TV series MythBusters, it is entirely distinct.

The pilot episode for the series was shot at TechShop in Menlo Park in December 2006.  Three sets were constructed in TechShop's large conference room, and the machine shop and sheet metal shop were painted in color schemes that would look good on camera.  Many parts of the TechShop facilities were used in the show pilot, including the main workshop, welding shop, and laser cutter room.

Episodes

References

External links
Discovery Channel homepage for "Prototype This"
Standard Metal Products - SMP 
Teaser video - "Inside Optical Glyph Tracking"
Sydney Morning Herald article on upcoming show
Casting call letter
CNet article, "Discovery Channel to bring TV glamour to product prototyping"

Discovery Channel original programming
2008 American television series debuts
2009 American television series endings
Television series by Beyond Television Productions